St Peter's Church of England Aided School is one of Exeter's five state sector high schools.

The school was awarded language college status in 2002. The current headteacher of the school is Phil Randall.

The old school building was knocked down (September 2006). Since then, a new building managed by Carillion has been in use. Carillion was then taken over by Sodexo in 2015 for a 5-year contract.

The school was formed by the amalgamation of Hele's School and Bishop Blackall School in 1983.

Notable former pupils
Ben Aldridge (born 1985) -  actor
Matt Grimes (born 1995) -  footballer
Joe Talbot (born 1984) - lead singer of Idles

References

External links
Official website

Schools in Exeter
Secondary schools in Devon
Church of England secondary schools in the Diocese of Exeter
Voluntary aided schools in England